Shael Oswal (born 28 May 1978) is an Indian pop singer, entrepreneur, and scion of an affluent business family.

Background and personal life
Shael Oswal was born on 28 May 1978 in Ludhiana, Punjab, His father Abhey Kumar Oswal was a textile businessman. His mother Aruna Oswal took charge as the chairman of the firm after his father demise in 2016. His elder brother, Pankaj Oswal, takes an active role in running the companies, under the auspices of his mother. Oswal's sister, Shallu Jindal, is the wife of prominent Indian Businessman Naveen Jindal. Oswal is a scion of the family which owns Oswal Agro Mills and Oswal Greentech. They have no connection to the Motilal Oswal group, or any other company bearing the name 'Oswal,' which is a common surname among the Oswal Jain community of tradesmen to which the family belongs.

Oswal did his schooling at Mayo College and graduated from Delhi University in commerce. 

Oswal has been married twice. His first wife, Apsara Trivedi Oswal, was a fashion model. They became the parents of two children, son Shivam and daughter Sohanaa Oswal. Oswal and Apsara are now divorced

Oswal's second wife is Sameksha, who has acted in some TV serials and music videos. They married at a local Gurudwara in Singapore in July 2020. Before tying the knot, Oswal has shot a couple of albums like Makhmalli Pyaar and Tere Naal with Sameeksha.

Career
Thanks to his family background, Shael is Director of coal mining company PT Garda Tujuh Buana. 

Oswal is a pop singer. His debut video album was “Dud”, the video album ‘Kahan Hai Tu’, it got a very good response and sold about a lakh copies, he got fame from hit track called Soniye Hiriye in 2006. Later he released many video albums like Jaan Ve, Zindagi, Yaar, Makhmalli Pyaar, Tere Naal, etc., His recent track was ‘Ishaara’ which was released the last valentine at JW Marriott in Chandigarh, the album was directed by Sameksha Oswal under SSO Production and music composed by Vidyut Goswami and had lyrics by Vimal Kashyap.

Oswal was the singer of the popular video album Soniye Hiriye released in 2006. He married popular actress Sameksha in July 2020. She was also the co-star of his album in Makhmalli Pyaar, Tere Naal.His latest video album Ishaara was directed by his wife Sameksha which was released in 2021 by valentine.

Video albums

References

External links
 

Living people
1978 births
Punjabi people
21st-century Indian singers
21st-century Indian male singers
Singers from Mumbai